The Boulevard du 30 Juin ("Boulevard of June 30th") is a major 5‑km street in Kinshasa, capital of the Democratic Republic of the Congo. It is the city center's main transport artery, connecting the southern area of La Gombe (Kinshasa's political and business district) with Kintambo and the Ngaliema to the west.

In 1963 the street was renamed from Boulevard Albert I to Boulevard du 30 Juin following the Belgian Congo's independence from Belgium on June 30, 1960.

Many national government offices are located on the Boulevard du 30 Juin, such as the Ministry of Communication, Ministry of Employment, Ministry of Finance, Ministry of Health, Ministry of Land Affairs, etc.

Gallery

See also 

 Trans-African Highway network

References

External link

Transport in Kinshasa